Soundproof may refer to:
 Soundproofing
 Sound Proof (album), a 2008 album by Greg Howe
 Soundproof (film), a British television drama film
 Soundproof (album), an album by ApologetiX
 Soundproof (band), English dubstep producers and DJs